Davoud Akhlaghi (born 16 April 1944) is an Iranian former cyclist. He competed in the individual road race and team time trial events at the 1964 Summer Olympics.

References

External links
 

1944 births
Living people
Iranian male cyclists
Olympic cyclists of Iran
Cyclists at the 1964 Summer Olympics
Place of birth missing (living people)
Asian Games bronze medalists for Iran
Asian Games medalists in cycling
Cyclists at the 1966 Asian Games
Medalists at the 1966 Asian Games
20th-century Iranian people